Capitulation may have the following special meanings.
Capitulation (surrender)
Stock market capitulation
Capitulation (treaty)
Capitulations of the Ottoman Empire
Capitulation (algebra)
Conclave capitulation
Electoral capitulation